Adamston is an unincorporated community located within Brick Township, Ocean County, New Jersey, United States. County Route 528 travels through Adamston, leading to neighboring Mantoloking to the east, on the Jersey Shore. The area is otherwise mostly made up of small bungalows spread along numerous residential roads in Adamston.

References

Brick Township, New Jersey
Unincorporated communities in Ocean County, New Jersey
Unincorporated communities in New Jersey